Nissan outboard motors are produced by Tohatsu Corporation of Tokyo, Japan. They are the second largest producer of outboard motors in the world and produce environmentally conscious TLDI series of two-stroke low pressure direct injection outboards that meet current United States Environmental Protection Agency regulations for the US. Mercury outboards from 30 hp and below are rebadged Tohatsus and all Nissan outboard engines in the US and Canada are Tohatsu's with a Nissan decal.

See also
Tohatsu outboards

External links 
Nissan Outboard Technical Information 
Nissan Outboard Russia Home page 

Nissan
Marine engine manufacturers
Engine manufacturers of Japan